Galbooly is a townland in the civil parish of the same name in County Tipperary in Ireland.

Townlands of County Tipperary
Eliogarty